Omicron Hydrae (ο Hya) is the Bayer designation for a solitary star in the equatorial constellation Hydra. At one time it bore the Flamsteed designation 25 Crateris, but this is no longer used by astronomers so as to avoid confusion. With an apparent visual magnitude of 4.70, this star is visible to the naked eye. Based upon an annual parallax shift of 7.27 mas, it is located around 449 light years from the Sun.

This is a B-type main sequence star with a stellar classification of B9 V. It has completed an estimated  of its lifetime on the main sequence. With 3.56 times the mass of the Sun, it radiates 309 times the Sun's luminosity from its outer atmosphere at an effective temperature of 10,495 K. The rate of spin is relatively high, with a projected rotational velocity of 160 km/s.

References

B-type main-sequence stars
Hydra (constellation)
Hydrae, Omicron
101431
056922
4494
Crateris, 25
Durchmusterung objects